Tina Morpurgo (March 6, 1907 – June 1, 1944) was a Croatian painter from Split.

Morpurgo was born on March 6, 1907, in Split to the notable Jewish Morpurgo family which originated from Marburg, Germany. After high school she devoted herself to painting and in 1931 she held her first single exhibition which showed over fifty of her works in oil, tempera and drawing. In 1932, Morpurgo attended a private school in Trieste. Morpurgo planned to pursue her schooling and further artistic development in Munich, but due to the rise of Nazism and the economic crisis, she remained in her hometown, and, disillusioned, stopped painting. In 1943 she was deported to the Banjica concentration camp together with her parents. On June 1, 1944, Morpurgo was killed by Schutzstaffel members. Her paintings were saved by the surviving members of her family and friends. Later her paintings were exhibited, in 1974, at the Jewish community of Split, at the Jewish community of Belgrade, and the Jewish Historical Museum in Belgrade in 1975.

References

Bibliography

 

1907 births
1944 deaths
Artists from Split, Croatia
People from the Kingdom of Dalmatia
Croatian Jews
Austro-Hungarian Jews
Croatian Austro-Hungarians
Croatian people of German-Jewish descent
Croatian painters
Jewish painters
People who died in Banjica concentration camp
Croatian civilians killed in World War II
Croatian people executed in Nazi concentration camps
Croatian women artists
20th-century women artists
Croatian Jews who died in the Holocaust
Jewish women artists